The Quinsigamond Branch Library, now part of the Quinsigamond Elementary School. is an historic school building and former library at 14 Blackstone River Road in Worcester, Massachusetts.  The building was originally built as a Carnegie Library in 1913 with funds donated by Andrew Carnegie, who was present to lay the cornerstone that year. It as since been converted into part of the Quingisamond Elementary School. The building was added to the National Register of Historic Places in 1980.

Description and history
The former Quinsigamond Branch Library building stands at the southwest corner of Blackstone River Road and Stebbins Street.  It is a single story masonry structure, built out of red brick with limestone trim.  Its main facade faces east, and is symmetrically arranged, with a central projecting entry pavilion flanked by groups of three windows.  The entry is sheltered by a shallow porch that projects from the pavilion, supported by round Ionic columns.  The flanking window groups consist of casement windows with decorative transoms above.  The roof is flat, but is obscured by a parapet with limestone coping.  The building is now joined to the adjacent elementary school building.

The library was one of three built in the city that were funded in part by a grant from Andrew Carnegie.  Before its branch libraries were built, residents in outer neighborhoods had to either travel to the central library on Elm Street, or use neighborhood pickup points.  The land on which it stands was donated by the American Steel and Wire Company.  The architects were the Fuller & Delano Company of Worcester.  The library was closed (along with all the other branches) in 1990.  It was thereafter joined to the school, and now houses its cafeteria.

See also
List of Carnegie libraries in Massachusetts
National Register of Historic Places listings in eastern Worcester, Massachusetts

References

Library buildings completed in 1913
Libraries in Worcester, Massachusetts
Schools in Worcester, Massachusetts
Libraries on the National Register of Historic Places in Massachusetts
Beaux-Arts architecture in Massachusetts
Carnegie libraries in Massachusetts
National Register of Historic Places in Worcester, Massachusetts
1913 establishments in Massachusetts
1990 disestablishments in Massachusetts